Malati Rishidev is the shortest woman in Nepal. She was born on September 3, 1999. She was born in Biratchowk, Morang district.

See also
Khagendra Thapa Magar - the former shortest man in world from Nepal. He died in January 2020.

References

People with dwarfism
1999 births
Living people
People from Morang District